Frederick II of Saxony  may refer to:
Frederick II, Elector of Saxony (1412–1464), Elector of Saxony between 1428 and 1464
Frederick Augustus II of Saxony (1797–1854), king of Saxony between 1836 and 1854

See also
Frederick II (disambiguation)